Kick Up The Fire are a British garage punk band from South East London. They released their debut EP Kick Up The Fire in 2010 which was later followed by their second EP Money Men in 2012

Band members
 Kenny Wastell – lead vocals, guitar
 Thom Wicks – bass guitar, vocals
 Marek Bereza – guitar
 Andrew Hutson – drums

References

British indie rock groups